Pulling Strings may refer to:

 Pulling Strings (film), a 2013 film
 Pulling Strings (album), a Steve Howe album
 "Pulling Strings" (White Collar), an episode of White Collar